Cyril Alexander Errington Rodríguez (born 30 March 1992) is a Salvadoran-born Nicaraguan professional footballer who plays as a defender for the Nicaragua national team.

His father is Nicaraguan and his mother is Salvadoran.

References

External links
 

1992 births
Living people
People with acquired Nicaraguan citizenship
Nicaraguan men's footballers
Association football central defenders
Nicaragua international footballers
2017 Copa Centroamericana players
2017 CONCACAF Gold Cup players
Nicaraguan people of Salvadoran descent
Nicaraguan Primera División players
Real Estelí F.C. players
Managua F.C. players
Salvadoran footballers
Salvadoran people of Nicaraguan descent
Primera División de Fútbol Profesional players
Alianza F.C. footballers
C.D. Dragón footballers
C.D. Luis Ángel Firpo footballers